W. gracilis may refer to:
 Wahlenbergia gracilis, a wildflower species
 Washingtonia gracilis, a palm species in the genus Washingtonia
 Wikstroemia gracilis, a shrub species in the genus Wikstroemia

See also
 Gracilis (disambiguation)